George Walton Academy (GWA) is a pre-Kindergarten through twelfth grade private school in Monroe, Georgia. It was established in 1969 as a segregation academy in response to school integration in the United States.

History
George Walton Academy was founded in 1969 during school desegregation in Good Hope, Georgia. It is now located in Monroe, Georgia and serves PK-12th grades with a student-teacher ratio of 10:1. According to brigadier general, author, and GWA alumnus Ty Seidule, the school was founded for one purpose: "Ensure white kids didn't have to go to school with Black kids." Initially, the school was located in Good Hope, Georgia, where the school took over the facilities of two public schools, the previously all-white Good Hope School and the previously all-black Good Hope-Peters School. In 1975, the school moved from Good Hope to Monroe.

As of 1983, several black children had been accepted for admission, but none had enrolled.

As of 1991, George Walton Academy was accredited by the Georgia Accrediting Commission, but not Southern Association of Colleges and Schools, which was considered the legitimate accrediting association for the state.

In 2010, George Walton Academy withdrew from the Georgia Independent School Association, which consists largely of former segregation academies, and started to compete alongside public schools in the Georgia High School Association athletic league. They would later return to the GISA (in the sector of GIAA) and continue athletics there.

In 2017, the school's global studies program was launched and includes educational study opportunities in Belize, France, the Galapagos Islands and Spain. Students have the chance to conduct field work alongside medical students from Johns Hopkins University in Belize.

In 2020, more than $4 million was pledged for the GWA "Go Beyond" campaign to expand and enhance the athletic and arts facilities on campus. The school was also awarded a School Empowerment Grant by Walton EMC to expand the high school physics program and lower school STEM program.

In 2021, George Walton’s board decided to fire headmaster Dan Dolan after four years of service.  The board later replaced him with Gary Hobbs, the current head of school.

Accreditation

The academy is accredited by the Georgia Accrediting Commission, Southern Association of Independent Schools and the Southern Association of Colleges and Schools. The academy is a member of the Georgia Independent School Association and the Georgia High School Association.

Fine arts 
Visual and performing arts classes are offered during the school day as well as enrichment opportunities after school in the form of co-curricular activities and student clubs. Advanced Placement classes are available in both music and the visual arts. Offerings include marching band, symphonic winds, concert ensemble, percussion, theater, chorus, visual arts, dance, photography, sculpture studio, yearbook.

Athletics 
GWA was a member of the Georgia High School Association (GHSA), Region 8, Class A division. Late November, 2021, GWA returned back to the Georgia Independent Athletic Association (GIAA), citing changes in GHSA’s landscape as the rationale. GWA's athletics programs have won GISA championships in football (1979, 1991, 2003, and 2009) basketball (1975 and 1984). Sports include baseball, basketball, cheerleading, cross country, equestrian, football, golf, lacrosse, majorettes, softball, swimming, equestrian, soccer, tennis, track, volleyball, and wrestling.

In 2020 the GHSA forced the school to forfeit 6 football games because of rules violations.

Investigations into the self-reported violations showed that players who had transferred from other local schools in the region were being provided monetary gain in return for playing on GWA’s American football team. Coach Shane Davis was fired and replaced with the new coach, Logan Beer.

Notable alumni
Kyle Chandler, actor (Friday Night Lights and Super 8)
Ty Seidule, brigadier general, author
John Clarence Stewart, actor and singer

Demographics
As of the 2018 school year (the most recent reported to NCES), the students included 8 Asian, 34 Black, 8 Hispanic, 670 White, and 10 of two or more races.

References

External links
 George Walton Academy
 George Walton Academy Band

Educational institutions established in 1969
Private high schools in Georgia (U.S. state)
Schools in Walton County, Georgia
Private middle schools in Georgia (U.S. state)
Private elementary schools in Georgia (U.S. state)
Preparatory schools in Georgia (U.S. state)
1969 establishments in Georgia (U.S. state)
Segregation academies in Georgia